Nader Belhanbel (born 1 July 1994) is a Moroccan athlete competing primarily in the 800 metres. He reached the final at the 2015 World Championships.

His personal best in the event is 1:44.64 from 2015.

Competition record

Personal bests
Outdoor
800 metres – 1:44.64 (Barcelona 2015)
1500 metres – 3:42.61 (Rabat 2013)
Indoor
1000 metres – 2:19.24 (Metz 2014)

References

Moroccan male middle-distance runners
Living people
1994 births
World Athletics Championships athletes for Morocco
20th-century Moroccan people
21st-century Moroccan people